"Ridin' High" is a 1968 soul album released by Motown girl group Martha and the Vandellas on the Gordy (Motown) label. This album featured the last Top 40 pop hits scored by the group during their recording tenure, "Love Bug Leave My Heart Alone" and "Honey Chile". It was a series of firsts for the group: it was the first album without the help of since departed producers William "Mickey" Stevenson and Holland–Dozier–Holland, however, Motown included one HDH track on the album, "Leave It In The Hands Of Love." Also on Ridin' High is a cover version of Dionne Warwick's then recent hit "I Say a Little Prayer."

Bringing in Richard Morris and songwriter Sylvia Moy, the group managed to release two hit singles though this was the beginning of the end for the group as hitmakers on the pop charts. Like their label mates The Supremes and the Four Tops, they stalled without the team of Holland-Dozier-Holland, although they continued to chart well on the R&B charts and in England until their 1972 disbanding. This was also the first album to include lead singer Martha Reeves's sister Lois Reeves, who was replacing Betty Kelly after Kelly was fired from the group in 1967 and also the first album where they were credited as Martha Reeves and the Vandellas. It was also the last album to feature original member Rosalind Ashford, who would exit out of the group shortly a year after this album came out.

Track listing

Personnel
Martha Reeves - lead vocals
Rosalind Ashford - backing vocals (side 1, tracks 1, 2, and 5; side 2, track 6)
Lois Reeves - backing vocals (side 1, tracks 1 and 2; side 2, track 6)
Betty Kelly - backing vocals (side 1, track 5)
The Andantes - backing vocals (side 1, tracks 3, 4, and 6; side 2, tracks 1-5)
The Funk Brothers - instrumentation

References

1968 albums
Gordy Records albums
Martha and the Vandellas albums